Roger Drummond Foley (April 28, 1917 – January 7, 1996) was a United States district judge of the United States District Court for the District of Nevada.

Education and career

Born in Goldfield, Nevada, Foley was the eldest of five sons of Helen Drummond and Roger Thomas Foley, the latter also having been a federal district judge in Nevada. The family moved to Las Vegas in 1928. He received a Bachelor of Laws from the University of San Francisco School of Law. During World War II, Foley flew over 50 combat missions as a first lieutenant bombardier and navigator in the United States Army Air Forces. He was a deputy district attorney of Clark County, Nevada from 1948 to 1951, then district attorney of that county until 1955. He was in private practice in Las Vegas from 1956 to 1958, and was the Attorney General of Nevada from 1959 to 1962.

Federal judicial service

On June 12, 1962, Foley was nominated by President John F. Kennedy to a new seat on the United States District Court for the District of Nevada created by 75 Stat. 80. He was confirmed by the United States Senate on June 29, 1962, and received his commission on July 2, 1962. He served as Chief Judge from 1963 to 1980, assuming senior status on October 29, 1982, and serving in that capacity until his death on January 7, 1996, in Las Vegas.

Honor

The Foley Federal Building and United States Courthouse in Las Vegas is named for the family, as a whole.

References

Sources
 

1917 births
1996 deaths
20th-century American judges
District attorneys in Nevada
Judges of the United States District Court for the District of Nevada
Nevada Attorneys General
People from Goldfield, Nevada
People from Las Vegas
United States Army Air Forces pilots of World War II
United States district court judges appointed by John F. Kennedy
University of San Francisco School of Law alumni